No Rest for the Wicked is the third studio album by the Canadian hard rock/heavy metal band Helix. It is also their major label debut, on Capitol Records.

The tracks "Heavy Metal Love" and "Never Want to Lose You" were released as singles with accompanying music videos.

Track list 
All songs written by Helix except where noted

 "Does a Fool Ever Learn" (3:28) (Eddie Schwartz)
 "Let's All Do It Tonight" (2:50)
 "Heavy Metal Love" (2:59)
 "Check Out the Love" (3:08)
 "No Rest for the Wicked" (3:12)
 "Don't Get Mad Get Even" (3:21) (Lisa Dalbello, Tim Thorney)
 "Ain't No High Like Rock 'n Roll" (3:50)
 "Dirty Dog" (3:32)
 "Never Want to Lose You" (3:09)
 "White Lace and Black Leather" (3:40)

Credits

Personnel 
 Brian Vollmer – vocals
 Paul Hackman – guitars, backing vocals
 Brent Doerner – guitars, backing vocals
 Mike Uzelac – bass, backing vocals
 Greg "Fritz" Hinz – drums

Production 
Produced by Tom Treumuth for H&S Productions.  Co-Produced by Helix and William Seip.
Mixed by Tony Bongiovi at Power Station Studios.
William Seip – manager
Heather Brown – artwork, cover concept

Singles 
 "Heavy Metal Love"
 "Don't Get Mad Get Even"

Charts

Album

Singles

References 

Helix (band) albums
1983 albums